The I. Zhansugurov Literary Museum in Taldykorgan is a center for the study of the poet Ilyas Zhansugurov. The museum is situated in the Republic of Kazakhstan, Almaty region, Taldykorgan city, 239 Abay Street.

Description 
The museum was established in 1984 to celebrate the 90th anniversary of the poet's birth. 

The main purpose of the museum is to collect, store and provide materials related to the life and literary activities of the poet. The museum organizes excursions and evenings in memory of the poet regularly. Its collection contains 6073 items of scientific, auxiliary and museum significance. The fund contains manuscripts, photographs, books, personal belongings and the poet's study.

Structure 
The museum covers an area of 280.5 square meters and consists of six rooms, each of which is a thematic exhibition:
 The poet's juvenile and adolescent years;
 Formation, development, social activity of the poet;
 The working room of the poet;
 Creativity Of Ilyas Zhansugurov;
 The poet's legacy.''
The building of the museum was constructed in 1907 and is a monument of architecture and urban planning, protected by the state.

References 

 Taldykorgan news portal
 Zhetysu
 Музей Жансугурова

Literary museums
Museums in Kazakhstan
Museums established in 1984